William John Clohesy (5 November 1894 – 8 November 1945) was an Australian rules footballer who played with Carlton in the Victorian Football League (VFL).

Notes

External links 

Bill Clohesy's profile at Blueseum

1894 births
1945 deaths
Australian rules footballers from Ballarat
Carlton Football Club players